Ilias Ioannou (born 24 February 1966) is a Cypriot judoka. He competed at the 1988 Summer Olympics and the 1992 Summer Olympics.

References

1966 births
Living people
Cypriot male judoka
Olympic judoka of Cyprus
Judoka at the 1988 Summer Olympics
Judoka at the 1992 Summer Olympics
Judoka at the 1990 Commonwealth Games
Commonwealth Games competitors for Cyprus
Place of birth missing (living people)